Yar Ahmadlu (also Romanized as Yār Aḩmadlū) is a village in Karasf Rural District, in the Central District of Khodabandeh County, Zanjan Province, Iran. At the 2006 census, its population was 141, in 29 families.

References 

Populated places in Khodabandeh County